Hysterical is an American comedy film directed by Chris Bearde. Released on July 30, 1983, by Embassy Pictures, it is a spoof of the horror film genre. The film stars the Hudson Brothers.

Plot
Frederic "Casper" Lansing is a writer who hopes to find inspiration while vacationing in Hellview, Oregon; however, the lighthouse in which he's staying is haunted by the ghost of Venetia, who had killed herself 100 years ago and now wants to use Lansing as a vessel for her dead lover, Captain Howdy. When Howdy's ghost starts killing people, two bumbling scientists are brought in to investigate the history of the lighthouse and solve the case.

Cast
 Bill Hudson as Frederic "Casper" Lansing
 Mark Hudson as Dr. Paul Batton
 Brett Hudson as Fritz Batton
 Cindy Pickett as Kate
 Richard Kiel as Captain James Howdy
 Julie Newmar as Venetia
 Bud Cort as Dr. John
 Robert Donner as Ralph
 Murray Hamilton as The Mayor
 Clint Walker as The Sheriff
 Franklyn Ajaye as Leroy
 Charlie Callas as Count Dracula
 Keenan Wynn as Old Fisherman
 Gary Owens as TV announcer
 John Larroquette as Bob X. Cursion

Home media
Hysterical was released on DVD by Image Entertainment on January 30, 2001.

References

External links
 
 

1983 films
1980s comedy horror films
American comedy horror films
American parody films
Embassy Pictures films
Films set in Oregon
Films shot in Oregon
American ghost films
Parodies of horror
Works set in lighthouses
1983 comedy films
1980s English-language films
1980s American films